Friedrich Rafreider (24 February 1942 – 15 September 2007) was an Austrian footballer. He played in 14 matches for the Austria national football team from 1961 to 1963.

References

External links
 

1942 births
2007 deaths
Austrian footballers
Austria international footballers
Place of birth missing
Association footballers not categorized by position